Eidsvoll Station was a railway station at Eidsvoll  in Akershus, Norway. It was located on the Trunk Line (Hovedbanen).

History
Eidsvoll Station opened in 1854 as the terminus of Norway's first railway. It had a temporary building at first, but a proper building with hotel was opened in 1858. That station building burned down on October 16, 1877. The present building  was designed by Jacob Wilhelm Nordan and constructed in 1878, similar to the previous. A  20-room hotel was established in the station building which from   1924 was under the operation of Norsk Spisevognselskap, which also took over the restaurant.

The former Eidsvoll Station remained in use until 1998, when the construction of the Gardermoen Line forced the opening of the new Eidsvoll Station which was built slightly northwards to allow it to serve the Trunk Line, the Gardermoen Line and the Dovre Line.

References

Other sources

Railway stations in Eidsvoll
Railway stations on the Trunk Line
Railway stations opened in 1854
Railway stations closed in 1998
1854 establishments in Norway